CX 42 Emisora Ciudad de Montevideo was a Uruguayan Spanish-language AM radio station that broadcasts from Montevideo.

Programs 
This radio station specializes in sports and music.

In 2002 it received a special award for its traditional covering of Carnival shows.

References

External links
 
 1370 AM

Spanish-language radio stations
Radio in Uruguay
Mass media in Montevideo
Radio stations established in 1930
1930 establishments in Uruguay